Yassin Alsalman, better known by his stage name Narcy (formerly The Narcicyst), is an Iraqi-Canadian rapper, author, university instructor and actor. He currently resides in Montreal, Quebec, Canada.

Biography
Alsalman's parents are originally from Basra, Iraq but emigrated to the United Arab Emirates (UAE) in the 1970s. Yassin was born in Dubai in 1982. In 1987, at the age of five, he and his family moved to Montreal, Quebec, Canada. Yassin spent much of his youth moving back and forth between Canada and the UAE, spending his high school years receiving an education in Dubai.

Career

Music
In 2000 Yassin moved back to Montreal and started working on his music production in a local recording studio. He has released ten albums and EPs as a solo artist and collaborated with Mashrou' Leila, A Tribe Called Red, yasiin bey.

Narcy's most recent album, 2020's Love & Chaos, was made over a five-week period during the coronavirus pandemic.

During a performance at 2019's Sole DXB Festival in Dubai, where he performed alongside Blackstar and Wu-Tang, Narcy stated that there "are not many people from Iraq in the rap game in North America, so I take my space with a great sense of responsibility."

On Sept. 8, 2020, musician Todd Rundgren released his new single, "Espionage," a collaboration with Narcy that features his lead vocals.

Narcy's performances and lyrics are often political. In 2017, he joined Jeremy Scahill, Desmond Cole and Naomi Klein for a taping of The Intercept podcast, during which he performed a spoken word poem.

He has also directed many of his own music videos, and those of frequent collaborators. His video for A Tribe Called Red ft Yaasiin Bey's R.E.D. won the 2017 "Video of the Year" at the Juno awards.

Acting
As an actor, he appeared in the movie City of Life which revolves around life in Dubai in 2009. In the movie, he played the role of Khalfan, a conflicted yet loyal Emirati teenager caught in a class struggle with his best friends. He has also starred in short Gemini-nominated series Verte, a musical short on the Green Line in Montreal's Metro system. He also is known to act in his music videos, both as Jamal in self-written RISE as well as Jassem in his latest release "Makoo", off World War Free Now!. He also voiced the playable character of Darius I, who speaks Aramaic, in the video game Sid Meier's Civilization V.

Academic
Since 2011, Alsalman has taught a course at Concordia University, in conjunction with Marc Peters, titled "Hip Hop: Past, Present, and Future". He has also taught a course on seeing current events through the lens of cultural frameworks. These classes are recorded as part of We Are The Medium's flagship podcast and have included guests such as Mochilla, A Tribe Called Red, Chance The Rapper, Lowkey, Dounia, Mashrou' Leila and many more.

Literature
In October 2020, Alsalman released his first multi-genre collection titled Text Messages or How I Found Myself Time Traveling, published by Haymarket Books. It has been called "an ambitious and bold time capsule capturing the insane times we're living through" by Hasan Minhaj and "a necessary read" by Talib Kweli. In 2015 Alsalman collaborated with renowned artist Ashraf Ghori to create a groundbreaking mixed-media project called World War Free Now which combined music, video, and comics together. A limited edition comic was released as a companion piece to Narcy's album.

Discography

Albums
Euphrates
 A Bend In The River (2003)
 Stereotypes Incorporated (2004)
The Narcicyst
Fear of an Arab Planet (2007) 
The Narcicyst (2009)
Mr. Asthmatic (2010)
Warchestra (2010) (a Sundus Abdul Hadi album in collaboration with The Narcicyst)
Narcy 
 Leap Of Faith EP (2013) 
 El Nargisee Project (2014) - All Arabic project 
 WeAreTheMedium EP (2014) 
World War Free Now! (2015) 
SPACETIME (2018)
 Love & Chaos (SpaceTime Vol 2) (2020)

Singles 
"#Jan25" (2011) – Produced by Sami Matar, this song features Syrian MC Omar Offendum, The Narcicyst, Freeway, Amir Sulaiman & Ayah. The hashtag is an ode to Twitter, which has been credited by many as playing an influential role in the Egyptian revolution.
"Fly Over Egypt" (2012)
"Leap of Faith" (EP, 2012) 
"Fake News" (2017)
"Chobi Bryant" (2017)
"Time" (2018)
"Space" (2018)
"Superhero" (2018)
"Thoughts and Prayers" (2018)

Filmography

Film 
 City Of Life (2009)
 Verte
 PHATWA
 RISE
 "Makoo" (Music video)

Voice Over 
 Civilization V - King Darius
 The Secret World - Black Pharaoh Zombies

Publications
 Diatribes of a Dying Tribe. Write or Wrong/Paranoid Arab Boy, 2011. .
 World War Free Now. Self published, 2015. 
 Text Messages or How I Found Myself Time Traveling. Haymarket Books, 2020.

See also
 Arabic hip hop

References

External links
 
 Article by Rupert Bottenberg, Montreal Mirror
 Euphrates Keeps it Positive by Tara Henley
 Stereotypes Incorporated review
 For The Narcicyst, Iraq is the Bomb article by Mandy Van Deven in Bitch (magazine) published May 21, 2009
 Arab Hip-Hop and Revolution: The Narcicyst on Music, Politics, and the Art of Resistance
 Iraqi-Canadian Hip-Hop Artist The Narcicyst

1982 births
Living people
Iraqi emigrants to Canada
Canadian male rappers
Iraqi expatriates in the United Arab Emirates
Iraqi hip hop musicians
Iraqi rappers
Musicians from Dubai
Musicians from Montreal
Emirati rappers
English language singers from Iraq
21st-century Canadian rappers
21st-century Canadian male musicians